Aap Kaa Surroor is a 2007 Indian Hindi-language romantic thriller film directed by Prashant Chadha and starring singer Himesh Reshammiya in his debut as an actor, alongside Hansika Motwani and Malika Sherawat. Reshammiya has claimed the story is based on his own life and was named after his music album Aap Kaa Surroor. It was shot mostly in Germany and was released on 29 June 2007. Critics panned the film although it turned out to be a commercial success. This was Hansika's first Hindi film as a leading actress, as she was previously seen in all her Hindi movies as a child star.

Synopsis 
The movie begins with a dead body of a TV journalist, Nadia Merchant, being found in a remote area, somewhere in Germany. Soon after, a famous Indian singer, HR, is arrested by German Police Officers after a concert on the charge of murdering a journalist. HR is put behind bars and the incidents begin to unravel as the movie goes into a flashback. While on a concert in Germany, performing with his best friend Shravan, HR meets the event organizer Khurana and his partner Ruby James. He also meets the event planner Riya, and falls in love at first sight. After initial reservations, Riya's father Mr. Bakshi approves of the match.

Things take a turn when HR is arrested. He asks Ruby James, a lawyer, to bail him out. But it is revealed that Ruby is in love with HR, while HR loves Riya. He escapes from his prison cell after taking the murdered TV journalist's father Ex-cop Feroz Merchant captive. He has to find the actual murderer in one day or else Riya will be married to someone else. To stop this from happening, he needs Riya's help. He approaches her for help, but Riya ignores him.

HR, Shravan, and Bani approach Ruby (on HR's hunch that Ruby is innocent of the murders) for help. They browse through all the Invoices and other Documents at Khurana's Office to find that severe losses on a previously finalized world tour deal gave Khurana the motive to framed HR. HR then proceeds to confront Khurana and after a car chase, he catches up with Khurana, who then confesses to having murdered Nadia and framing HR to ruin his career. After his confession is instantly caught on camera, Khurana is arrested, then HR and Riya reunite.

Cast 
 Himesh Reshammiya as HR / Himself
 Hansika Motwani as Riya Bakshi
 Mallika Sherawat as Advocate Ruby James; Khurana's Business partner
 Darshan Jariwala as Khurana; Advocate Ruby James's Business partner
 Raj Babbar as Ex-cop Feroz Merchant; Nadia's father
 Shravan as Shravan Kumar
 VJ Bani as Bani, Riya's friend
 Sachin Khedekar as Mr. Bakshi, Riya's father
 Anant Mahadevan as TV News Reporter for Channel ITV
 Ishitha Chauhan as Trishnu
 Lovepreet Aujla as Himesh's friend
 Marrissa Lawrence as Nadia F. Merchant
 Sanjay Sharma as Raju
 Pankaj Jha as Ghulam Sayyed auto rickshaw Driver
 Abhijeet Chavan as Chinman Rao auto rickshaw driver
 Lallan Dubey as Lallan Dubey auto rickshaw driver
 Souzan Alavi as Background Dancer
 Kathrin Susanne Rieger as Fan
 Esther Maria Pietsch as Flight Attendant
 Ryan Estrada as Himself (German police officer)
 Ron Matz as Sam (German police officer)
 Esther Maria Pietsch as stewardess (German police officer)
 Frank Brandstatter as man in the crowd; Indian journalist in the background who helps to translate Khurana's confession
 Vijay Taneja as Mr. Vijay Taneja / Himself (Special Appearance)
 Johannes Bergner (German Police Officer)
 Frederic Schaefer (German Police Officer)

Box office and reception 
According to Box Office India, Aap Kaa Surroor grossed  and was given the final verdict of a Super Hit.

Soundtrack 

The music was composed by Himesh Reshammiya; the lyricist was Sameer. According to the Indian trade website Box Office India, with around 13,00,000 units sold, this film's soundtrack album was the year's seventh highest-selling.

Sequel 

The sequel of the film titled Teraa Surroor was announced in December 2015. It stars Farah Karimae and Himesh Reshammiya in the lead cast and was released on 11 March 2016.

Awards

References

External links 
 

Films scored by Himesh Reshammiya
2000s Hindi-language films
2007 films
Films set in Germany
Films shot in Germany
Hindi-language thriller films
2000s romantic thriller films
2007 thriller films
Himesh Reshammiya